"Anita Got Married" is a single by Canadian country music artist Duane Steele. Released in 1996, it was the second single from his album P.O. Box 423. The song reached number one on the RPM Country Tracks chart in Canada in July 1996.

Chart performance

Year-end charts

References

Songs about marriage
1996 songs
1996 singles
Duane Steele songs
Songs written by Jeff Stevens (singer)
Songs written by Michael Clark (songwriter)
Mercury Records singles